Below is a list of all countries in Africa, in order of geographical area. Algeria has been the largest country in Africa and the Arab world since the division of Sudan in 2011. Seychelles is the smallest country in Africa overall, with The Gambia being the smallest country on continental Africa.

Notes

See also
List of African countries by population
List of Asian countries by area
List of European countries by area
List of North American countries by area
List of Oceanian countries by area
List of South American countries by area

References

area
African countries
Area